Eyles's harrier (Circus teauteensis) is an extinct bird of prey which lived in New Zealand. Its closest relative is the smaller Swamp harrier (Circus approximans), which arrived in New Zealand after its extinction.

Name
This species was named after Jim Eyles, paleontologist and former director of the Nelson Provincial Museum and the West Coast Museum.

Taxonomy
Eyles' harrier was presumably somewhat similar to the living spotted harrier, its closest living relative, from which it diverged around 2.4 million years ago.

Description
Its shape differed from that of most other harriers, and it was initially mistaken for a huge hawk, possibly a giant Accipiter.

Ecology
It was a generalist predator, taking prey of the same size as small eagle species do: land animals weighing one or a few kilograms. In its hunting strategy, however, it was more adapted to avian prey, as mammals were entirely absent from New Zealand. Presumably, it hunted diurnal birds in a manner similar to goshawks.

Taxonomy
The nomenclature and taxonomy of C. teauteensis are quite convoluted. As Circus eylesi, it was only described in the mid-20th century, from remains found in Pyramid Valley in the South Island of New Zealand. However, essentially identical bones had been found about 100 years earlier by Augustus Hamilton and discussed subsequently by Henry Ogg Forbes; this material probably comes from the Te Aute region in the North Island. Forbes gave it the names Circus hamiltoni and Circus teauteensis, but since it seems no holotype was ever formally named nor can be deduced from the minimal description; these names are generally considered nomina nuda. C. teauteensis is considered valid, based on the argument that as with many New Zealand birds, it is reasonable to assume that North and South Island populations were at least distinct subspecies, if not species. But even though Kálmán Lambrecht mentioned a putative holotype tibiotarsus (which still exists in the BMNH) he explicitly stated that Forbes' names were both invalid. In addition, harrier bones of comparatively recent age in the collection of Walter Mantell, assigned to C. gouldi (an obsolete name of C. approximans) by Richard Lydekker, seem to be of a more robust bird judging from the published descriptions; this material may now be lost, but all things considered it is not unlikely to be the first remains of Eyles' harrier known to science.

Extinction
The modern swamp harrier occurs all over New Zealand today. Even though the bones of its females can be mistaken for those of Eyles's harrier's males (as they differ little except in stoutness), all swamp harrier remains from the islands that have been studied in detail are some 1000 years old at most. That means that they post-date human settlement, i.e. there is no evidence for widespread coexistence of swamp and Eyles' harriers on New Zealand. Apparently, despite their considerable differences, the two harriers were still ecologically similar enough to competitively exclude one another, and only when the endemic Eyles' harrier became extinct could C. approximans become established.

Possible sightings
A noted explorer, Charles Edward Douglas, claims in his journals that he had an encounter with two raptors of immense size in the Landsborough River valley (probably in the 1870s), and shot and ate them. These birds might have been a last remnant of the mighty pouakai (mythical represenation of Haast's eagle), but this is very unlikely: for about half a millennium before then there had not been enough suitable prey for a population of Haast's eagle to maintain itself; furthermore, 19th-century Māori lore was quite adamant that the pouakai was a bird not seen in living memory.

Still, Douglas' observations on wildlife are generally trustworthy; a more probable explanation, given that the alleged three-metre wingspan of Douglas' birds is unlikely to have been more than a rough estimate, is that the birds were Eyles' harriers – modern estimates tend to assume that a 3-metre wingspan is decidedly large even for Haast's eagle; the wingspan of Eyles' harrier was probably somewhat short of 2 metres. Although the Eyles' harrier also became extinct in prehistoric times, its dietary habits alone make it a more likely candidate for late survival.

References

External links

Wingspan Birds of Prey Trust
Zealand Birds Online

Eyles's harrier
Extinct birds of New Zealand
Bird extinctions since 1500
Late Quaternary prehistoric birds
Eyles's harrier